Point Defiance may refer to:
 Point Defiance Park in Tacoma, Washington, USA
 Point Defiance Zoo & Aquarium within the park
 USS Point Defiance (LSD-31), a dock landing ship
 Point Defiance Elementary School, a school located within Tacoma, Washington
 Point Defiance Bypass, a rail line in Pierce County, Washington, USA